Alyagish (Alyağış) is a rural locality (a village) in Kazanchinsky Selsoviet, Askinsky District, Bashkortostan, Russia. The population was 94 as of 2010. There is 1 street.

Geography 
Alyagish is located 36 km northwest of Askino (the district's administrative centre) by road. Yankisyak is the nearest rural locality.

References 

Rural localities in Askinsky District